This is a list of Ottoman Empire and allied sail and steam frigates of the period 1650-1867:
The guns listed are sometimes approximate as it's difficult to get accurate data for early Ottoman warships.

Algiers Eyalet 
 ? 37 - Spanish Nuestra Señora de Trapana
 El-Merikane 36 (1797, ex-Crescent) was built at Portsmouth, NH, as tribute for the Dey of Algiers and launched from the U.S. Navy Yard on 29 June 1797; stricken 1805
 Mashouda 46 (1802) Stephen Decatur, Jr, of the U.S. Navy, captured her in 1815; the U.S. returned her. She was sunk at Algiers 1816
 El-Portugaziye 36 (ex-Portuguese "N.a S.a do Bom Despacho, Cisne" (1779-1802; 36 guns), captured 1802 in the Mediterranean and sunk at Algiers during the Bombardment of Algiers (1816)
 Grande frigate 50 (1805) - Sunk at Algiers 1816
 El-Tunisiye 44 (1804, ex-Tunisian, obtained 1811) - Sunk at Algiers 1816
 El-Jazairiye 38 (1812) - ?
 ? 32 (ex-Moroccan El-Mansouriye, obtained 1817) - Storm 1822
 Rehber Iskender 40 (1818) - Egyptian 1830, stricken before 1836
 Meftah el-Jihad 46 (~1820?) - Egyptian 1830, stricken after 1838
 Bel Houaz/El-Touloniye (1822) - French 1830, BU 1830/31

Tripolitania Eyalet 
 ? 32 (ex-French, captured 1668)
 Looking Glass (34) - Burnt 1676
 Sancta Chiara (24) - Burnt 1676
 Philadelphia (36) – ex-, captured 1803; a U.S. naval boarding party under Lieutenant Stephen Decatur, Jr. set fire to her in 1804, destroying her

Ottoman Empire

17th century 
 ? 34 - Captured by Venice 1660
 ? 25 - Captured by Venice 1660
 ? 30 - Captured by Venice 1662
 ? 24 - Captured by Venice 1662
 ? 36 (ex-French, captured 1668)
 ? 30 (ex-French, captured 1668)

18th century 
 (6 frigates) - Burnt at the Battle of Chesma 1770
 ? - Burnt 1772
 ? 30 - Burnt 1772
 (7 frigates) 30 - Burnt 1772
 ? 30 - Sunk 1772

Napoleonic era 
 ? 28 (ex-French Brune, captured 1799)
 ? 40 (ex-French Justice, captured 1801)
 ? 40 - Aground and sunk 1807
 ? 36 - Aground and sunk 1807
 ? 36 - Aground and sunk 1807
 ? 32 - Aground and sunk 1807
 Uri Bahar (British Royal Navy (RN) version of the name; 40 guns) - The RN took possession of her  on 21 March 1807 during the Alexandria expedition of 1807. Uri Bahar had twenty-eight 18-pounder guns on her upper deck, and six 8-pounder guns and six 18-pounder carronades on her QD and Fc. There is no record that the RN evere commissioned her. It disposed of her i in 1809. 
 Uri Nasard (RN version of the name; 34 guns) - The RN took possession of her on 21 March 1807 during the Alexandria expedition of 1807. The Royal Navy commissioned Uri Nasard circa January 1808.  Captain George Hony (or Honey) took command of Uri Nasard. She was armed with twenty-six 12-pounder guns on her upper deck, and eight 6-pounders (QD/Fc). The RN disposed of her in 1809. * * Meskeni-ghazi 50 (A)
 Bedr-i Zafar 50 (A)
 Fakih-i Zafar 50 (A)
 Nessim 50 - Aground and burnt 1807
 Iskenderiye 44 (A)
 Badere Zafer/Bedr-i zafar 52 -  captured her on 5/6 July 1808. In 1847 the Admiralty issued the clasp "Seahorse Wh. Badere Zaffere" to the Naval General Service Medal (1847) to surviving claimants from the action
 ? - Captured by Russia 1810
 Mahubey Subhan 40 - Captured by Russia 1811

Greek War of Independence 
 ? - Wrecked 1822
 ? 54 - Burnt by fireship 1824
 Asia 44 - Burnt by fireship 1825
 ? 66 (possibly cut-down battleship) - Burnt by fireship 1825
 ? 64 (N) - Blew up during the Battle of Navarino 1827
 ? 56 (N) - Captured by the UK and blown up at the Battle of Navarino, 1827
 ? (N)
 ? (N)
 ? 52 (N)
 ? 64 (N) - Sunk during the Battle of Navarino 1827
 ? (N)
 ? (N)
 ? (N)
 "Conquerant" 56 (N) - Captured by Russia and blown up at the Battle of Navarino, 1827
 ? (N)
 "Grande Sultane" (N) - Captured by France at the Battle of Navarino 1827
 ? (N)

Ottoman frigates, 1829
Hıfz-ı Rahmân 60
Feyz-i Mi'rac 48
Keyvan-ı Bahrî 48
Fevz-i Nusret 64
 Bandino Seret
 Mejra Zafer 48
 (10 ships) 42
 Nouhan Bahari 50
 M'sian Zafer 50
 Chabal Bahari 50
 Naoum Bahari 50
 ? - Captured by the UK 1840 (returned?)
 Diwân

Note that some of the later ships in this list may be repeats, due to bad transliteration.

Ottoman frigates, 1839

Ottoman frigates, 1853

Citations

References
İsmail Hami Danişmend, İzahlı Osmanlı Tarihi Kronolojisi, 4. Cilt, Türkiye Yayınevi, p. 148.
Candan Badem, The Ottoman Crimean War (1853-1856), Brill, 2010, p. 117.

Notes 

Naval ships of the Ottoman Empire
Ottoman 
Lists of ships of the Ottoman Empire